Ed Swiderski (born July 20, 1979) is an American marketing technology executive and television personality who was the winner on season 5 of the reality TV show The Bachelorette.

Early life and career 
Swiderski was born in Monroe, Michigan and attended Erie-Mason High School. While attending Michigan State University, he began working as a technology intern at Voyager.net. After graduating with a Bachelor of Science in Information Technology Management, Swiderski went on to work in a variety of capacities throughout the technology industry including NuSoft, Magenic, and Microsoft. Ed co-founded Kambio Group, a digital marketing agency, and speaks at media and technology conferences throughout the country.  Kambio Group was acquired by Legacy Marketing Partners in 2013, and Swiderski is now the Senior Vice President of Digital.

Publications 
Ed co-authored Pinterest for Business with Jess Loren, the first globally printed guide to business marketing on Pinterest, and has been featured in Inc. Magazine, Fast Company, and several other highly accredited business publications.

Personal life 
In July 2015, Swiderski married Natalie Bomke, anchor and host of Good Day Chicago (WFLD Fox Chicago).

In May 2020, his first child Olive was born.

Education 
Ed is a Michigan State University alumnus, and was a member of Sigma Alpha Epsilon.

Reality television 
Swiderski appeared as a contestant in the fifth season of the ABC reality show The Bachelorette. He left the competition in episode 5 to focus on his job with Microsoft, but returned in episode 7.
Swiderski went on to win the competition, and became engaged to Bachelorette Jillian Harris.
The couple split in 2010.
He then went on to compete on season 3 of Bachelor Pad.

Education technology nonprofit
Swiderski co-founded the non-profit Global Education Open Technology Foundation GEOTF, which promotes open standards in education that improves the quality of life of underprivileged students around the world.

Other media
After The Bachelorette, Swiderski continued to be in the public eye, appearing on The Ellen DeGeneres Show, and Entertainment Tonight.

Currently, Swiderski blogs for ChicagoNow, and assists at SocialTechPop with Loren and Justin DiSandro.

References

External links

You're ed to me

1979 births
Living people
Michigan State University alumni
People from Monroe, Michigan
Businesspeople from Chicago
Reality show winners
Bachelor Nation contestants